Harold Livingstone Fraser  (21 December 1890 – 1 November 1950) was an Australian aviator born in Rockhampton, Queensland.

Military career
Fraser worked as a station overseer in central-western Queensland before enlisting at the age of 24 for service in World War I. Joining the 5th Light Horse Brigade of the First Australian Imperial Force on 25 September 1915 and fighting in the Gallipoli Campaign, he eventually transferred to the Australian Flying Corps' No. 1 Squadron on 7 April 1917. He was awarded the Military Cross for distinguished services in the field in connection with military operations culminating in the capture of Jerusalem.

Civilian career
After his war service, Fraser returned to Queensland and engaged in raising and trading sheep. 
In 1931, he founded Rockhampton Aerial Services and carried passengers, newspapers and money between Brisbane and central Queensland by air.

Following a plane crash, Rockhampton Aerial Services was sold to Airlines of Australia in 1936. Fraser once more turned to agriculture and bought a cattle station. With his brother Donald he also engaged in successful gold mining. Suffering severe burns in a house fire, Harold Fraser died on 1 November 1950. He left behind his wife, two daughters and one son.

See also
 List of people from Rockhampton
 Australian Army

References

1890 births
1950 deaths
People from Queensland
Australian aviators
Recipients of the Military Cross